Marc Navarro Ceciliano (born 2 July 1995) is a Spanish professional footballer who plays for USL Championship club El Paso Locomotive. Mainly a right-back, he can also play as a central defender.

Club career

Espanyol
Born in Barcelona, Catalonia, Navarro finished his youth career while on loan at CF Damm, after representing CF Badalona, FC Barcelona and RCD Espanyol. In July 2014, he was assigned to the latter's reserve team in the Segunda División B.

Navarro made his senior debut on 2 November 2014, coming on as a second half substitute for Rober Correa in a 2–1 away loss against Elche CF Ilicitano. His first goal came on 5 September 2015, when he closed the 3–2 home win over FC Barcelona B.

On 22 December 2015, Navarro signed a one-year extension with the club, with his new contract running until June 2017. The following 4 January, however, he suffered a severe knee injury, being sidelined for six months.

Navarro made his first-team – and La Liga – debut on 21 January 2017, starting and scoring the last goal in a 3–1 home victory against Granada CF and becoming the first youth graduate to achieve the feat since Raúl Tamudo in 1997. Eight days later, in his second appearance, he netted his team's second in a 3–1 defeat of Sevilla FC also at the RCDE Stadium. 

On 30 January 2017, Navarro extended his contract until 2021, being definitely promoted to the first team the following campaign.

Watford
On 15 June 2018, Navarro joined Watford on a five-year deal for €2 million. His maiden Premier League appearance took place on 29 September, when he played 84 minutes in the 2–0 loss at Arsenal.

After only five competitive appearances in his first season, Navarro returned to Spain and its top tier after agreeing to a one-year loan at CD Leganés on 24 July 2019. He left Watford by mutual consent in August 2021.

El Paso Locomotive
On 3 November 2022, Navarro signed for USL Championship club El Paso Locomotive FC.

Personal life
Navarro was a childhood friend of compatriot Héctor Bellerín, who also played in England with Arsenal. The former commented that both used to play football together in the garden of his grandmother's house.

Career statistics

References

External links

1995 births
Living people
Spanish footballers
Footballers from Barcelona
Association football defenders
La Liga players
Segunda División B players
CF Damm players
RCD Espanyol B footballers
RCD Espanyol footballers
CD Leganés players
Premier League players
English Football League players
Watford F.C. players
USL Championship players
El Paso Locomotive FC players
Spanish expatriate footballers
Expatriate footballers in England
Expatriate soccer players in the United States
Spanish expatriate sportspeople in England
Spanish expatriate sportspeople in the United States